Found in Winnipeg, Manitoba, Canada is 62M Condominium designed by 5468796 Architecture. Located at the edge of downtown Winnipeg, the building site is located between the freeway and the back of neighboring properties. The building site was originally considered an undesirable location to build because of its lack of views and isolated location. To overcome this, architect partners Johanna Hurme, Sasa Radulovic, and Colin Neufeld came up with the idea of raising the building off of the ground so that it was higher than the surrounding buildings. After raising it, their budget became much more restricted. To help with cost efficiency they made the building have a circular form as it could encompass the same area using thirty percent less building materials than the rectangular form. The building has 40 identical trapezoid units and a glass penthouse on top of the structural core, each unit starts at approximately 10 feet wide around the entrance (located adjacent to the structural core) and 20 feet wide towards the exterior featuring 6 meter tall windows.

Location 
Located on the edge of downtown Winnipeg, the building was placed on an undesirable lot with no views, no street frontage, and considerable budget challenges. To compensate for the lack of views architects from 5468796 architecture decided to raise the building above the surrounding landscape to give it better views of the Disraeli freeway and Waterfront Drive.

Design and construction 
The center of the building is constructed using cast in place concrete that houses stairs, an elevator, and a maintenance shaft; this is considered the structural core of the building. The circular form of the building was designed to offset the costs of having the building raised, the building could be built with 30 percent less materials than if it were a square or rectangle.

The building has 40 identical trapezoid units and a glass penthouse on top of the structural core, each unit starts at approximately 10 feet wide around the entrance (located adjacent to the structural core) and 20 feet wide towards the exterior featuring 6 meter tall windows. The units are arranged with the utility areas (such as laundry, maintenance, bathroom, and kitchen) located closest to the entrance. While the core and the open living areas (such as bedroom, living room, and dining room) are located nearest to the window to best utilize the 360 degree window perimeter of the building.

The material palette of the building consists of raw concrete (left raw to minimize maintenance costs), weathering steel, wood, and glass. Each unit is approximately 610 square feet (57 square meters), and has a narrow perimeter dedicated to communal corridors and a larger perimeter dedicated to windows. Each of the units was built offsite as a prefabricated wall and floor sections each in the trapezoidal shape of the apartment it would be; the window system was also prefabricated and developed offsite.

The building is divided into units for sale and units for rent; units for sale are approximately $200,000 to $260,000 depending on the view, and units for rent are approximately $1,150 to $1,600 depending on the furnishings and the view.

References

External links 
 https://archello.com/project/62m
 https://www.azuremagazine.com/article/best-canadian-architecture-2018/
 https://www.azuremagazine.com/article/condo-building-winnipeg-5468796-architecture/
 https://www.architectural-review.com/buildings/62m-condominium-apartments-in-canada-by-5468796-architecture
 https://www.winnipegfreepress.com/business/unique-structure-presents-design-challenges-471594874.html
 https://www.cbc.ca/news/canada/manitoba/ufo-building-winnipeg-1.3981026
 https://www.winnipegfreepress.com/arts-and-life/entertainment/arts/rooms-with-a-view-575843442.html
 https://divisare.com/projects/444971-5468796-architecture-james-brittain-james-florio-photography-62m

Buildings and structures in downtown Winnipeg
Residential condominiums in Canada
Residential buildings completed in 2017